Cvilin is a village in the municipalities of Foča, Republika Srpska and Foča-Ustikolina, Bosnia and Herzegovina.

The Chronicle of the Priest of Dioclea recorded that, at the time of Serbian Knez Časlav Klonimirović ( - c. 950), a Hungarian nobleman Kish had plundered Bosnia. The Priest of Dioclea wrote that King Časlav assembled an army and confronted Kish in the Drina area, close to the river. The battle took place in the place of Civelino - i.e. the present-day Cvilin. Kish was defeated and killed in the battle.

Demographics 
According to the 2013 census, its population was 260, with 30 living in the Republika Srpska part, and 230 living in the Foča-Ustikolina part.

References

Populated places in Foča-Ustikolina
Populated places in Foča